The 1993 Uzbek League season was the 2nd edition of top level football in Uzbekistan since independence from the Soviet Union in 1992. Neftchi Farg'ona once again won the league and the championship outright this time after previously sharing with Pakhtakor Tashkent the season before.

On winning the championship, Nefchi also qualified for the next edition of the AFC Champions League, the first time a club side from Uzbekistan would play in AFC competitions. They would also enter the 1994 Commonwealth of Independent States Cup a competition for former members of the Soviet Union.

Pakhtakor Tashkent won the 1993 Uzbek Cup and would take their place in the 1994–95 Asian Cup Winners' Cup.

Dinamo Samarqand and Kushon Kosonsoy were relegated.

Teams

Shahrixonchi Shahrixon, Kimyogar Olmaliq and Surxon Termiz were relegated to the Uzbekistan 1-Division in the 1992 season campaign and were replaced by Shifokor Guliston and Politotdel Tashkent.

During the off season, three teams decided to change name: 

 Kosonsoychi Kosonsoy changed name to Kushon Kosonsoy
 Maroqand Samarqand changed name to Dinamo Samarqand
 Pakhtakor-79 Toshkent changed name to MHSK Tashkent.

League standings

Match results

Top scorer

References
Uzbekistan - List of final tables (RSSSF)

Uzbekistan Super League seasons
1
Uzbek
Uzbek